The Učka Tunnel is a toll tunnel on the A8 motorway in Croatia. The tunnel consists of a single tube, with two traffic lanes. Construction on the existing tunnel tube began in 1978 and it was opened for traffic on September 27, 1981. It is currently used for traffic in both directions. An additional tunnel tube is under construction.

In a 2004 traffic safety test by ADAC, the Učka Tunnel shared the last place with Tuhobić Tunnel, also from Croatia, being classified as a high-risk transportation utility. , the Tuhobić Tunnel has been upgraded to four lanes. However, no improvements have been made to the Učka Tunnel, causing a demonstration clogging the traffic at a tunnel entrance by Istrian bikers. The fact that the tunnel bears a 30 kuna (US$ 5.80) toll, unusually high for Croatian highways, and that its roadway is in a bad shape, drew criticism from Croatian newspapers.

Over 40 million vehicles have passed through the tunnel, with more than 2.7 million passing in 2007 alone. During the summer of 2008, on average 14,000 vehicles passed daily, prompting the highway concessioner BINA Istra to start preparation of construction of the second tunnel tube. , 27 years have passed since the opening of the first tunnel and the traffic has increased sixfold, however the second tube is not yet built. In June 2011, BINA Istra announced that design documents are being prepared for construction of the second tunnel tube, and that construction is scheduled to start in mid-2012, estimating its completion in 2015.
The tunnel is run by BINA Istra, a consortium operating on a BOT scheme, owning the highway in a concession from 1995 to 2027. The construction of the second tube of the Učka tunnel officially began in December 2020 and will last until July 2023.

See also 
 A8 motorway
 BINA Istra
 Učka

References

External links 

Road tunnels in Croatia
Toll tunnels in Europe
Buildings and structures in Istria County
Tunnels completed in 1981